Shahinur Alam Shahin (stage name Shahin Alam ; 6 December 1962 – 8 Marh 2021) was a Bangladeshi actor who has appeared in films like Hathat Brishti (1998), Ghater Majhi (1998), Mastaner Upor Mastan (2002) etc.

 Career 
Shahin Alam started his career with theatre plays and then he was selected in Bangladesh Fresh Face Talent Hunt organised by BFDC in 1986. His debut film was Mayer Kanna (1986)  His notable films are "Ghaater Majhi", "Ek Palke", "Gariber Sansar", "Teji", "Chandabaj", "Prem Pratishodh", "Tiger", "  Rag-Anurag ,  Daagi Sontan,  Bagha-Baghini ,  Alif Laila ,  Dream Hero ,  Anjuman ,  Unknown Enemy ,  Traitor ,  Prem Diwana , My Mother ,  Crazy Babul,  Hothat Brishti ,  Fight for Power   Dalpati ,  Sinful Child ,  Dhakaiya Mastan ,  Big Boss ,  Father ,  Baby Tiger ,  Rebel Salauddin  Fresh men  etc. He was a martial artist and earned a black belt. He has appeared in over 150 films, most of them as supporting actors.

Filmography

Death
Alam was suffering from damaged kidneys and he was admitted to hospital on 13 July 2020. After fighting illness for 8 months in the hospital, Alam died on 8 March 2021 at the age of 58.

References

External links 
 

1962 births
2021 deaths
Bangladeshi film actors
People from Dhaka